The Battle of New Orleans was fought in January 1815, part of the War of 1812.

Battle of New Orleans may also refer to:

 Capture of New Orleans, 1862 operation of the American Civil War
 Battle of Liberty Place, 1874 battle between Democratic Conservatives and Republican Reconstructionists
 "The Battle of New Orleans", song by Jimmie Driftwood

See also
Battle of Orléans (disambiguation)